Bulbophyllum bicolor is a species of orchid in the genus Bulbophyllum. It is found only in Hong Kong and isolated parts of southeast China and northern Vietnam.

References
The Bulbophyllum-Checklist
The Internet Orchid Species Photo Encyclopedia

bicolor
Plants described in 1830